Garak Market Station is a station on Line 3 and Line 8 of Seoul Metropolitan Subway. Garak Market Station is nearby Garak Market,  which is one of the largest whole-sale centers in Seoul. It is also near GS Mart, which is a large supermarket.

Station layout

Line 3

Line 8

References 

Seoul Metropolitan Subway stations
Metro stations in Songpa District
Railway stations opened in 1996
Seoul Subway Line 3
Seoul Subway Line 8